Zarya severa (Northern Lights) is a red grape variety. It is a descendant of the Asiatic wild grape Vitis amurensis and the grape Malingre Précoce and is thus a hybrid vine. The crossing took place at the Potapenko Viticulture Research Institute in Rostov Oblast, Russia in 1936. Because of its high winter frost resistance as well as its resistance to downy mildew, this variety, often mentioned by breeders in Eastern Europe, became a major breeding stock in the search for new varieties.

Synonym: Zora Severa

Parentage: Malingre Précoce x Vitis amurensis

Descendants
In 1964 Professor Vilém Kraus in Czechoslovakia crossed the varieties Zarya Severa x St. Laurent. Prof. Kraus offered the seedlings to Prof. Dr. Helmut Becker (1927-1990), then at the Geisenheim Grape Breeding Institute, who recognized the importance of this material and did further breeding. From this, now called Gm 6494, the seedling Gm 6494-5 was selected due to its special performance, and later propagated under the name Rondo as a separate variety and first put into cultivation by Thomas Walk in Ireland.

Zarya Severa is also a grandparent of the white grape Solaris, which is of great importance in the marginal areas of northern Europe.

Through the breeding of Gm 6494, Zarya Severa was likewise ancestral to the new varieties Bronner, Baron, Cabernet Carbon, Prior and Souvignier gris.

Bibliography 
 Pierre Galet: Dictionnaire encyclopédique des cépages. Hachette, Paris 2000, .

References

Hybrid grape varieties
Red wine grape varieties